Muhammad Saeef Sayd is a Yemeni writer. His fiction piece "Waiting" has been translated into English and appeared in a 1988 anthology of modern Arabian literature.

References

20th-century Yemeni writers
Living people
Year of birth missing (living people)
Place of birth missing (living people)